Motoyama Station is the name of five train stations in Japan:

 Motoyama Station (Nagoya), in Aichi Prefecture
 Motoyama Station (Chiba), in Chiba Prefecture
 Motoyama Station (Takamatsu), on the Kotoden Nagao Line in Kagawa Prefecture
 Motoyama Station (Mitoyo), in Mitoyo, Kagawa Prefecture
 Motoyama Station (Nagasaki), on the Nishi-Kyūshū Line in Nagasaki Prefecture

See also 
 Motoyama (disambiguation)